Capys juliae, the Julia's protea copper, is a butterfly in the family Lycaenidae. It is found in north-western Kenya. The habitat consists of montane grassland at altitudes between 2,100 and 2,400 meters.

The larvae feed on Protea gaguedi.

References

Butterflies described in 1988
Capys (butterfly)